Grypoceras is a  coiled nautiloid cephalopod from the Triassic of western North America, southern Asia, and Europe that belongs to the nautilid family Grypoceratidae.  Named by Alpheus Hyatt in 1883, the shell of Grypoceras is essentially involute with a  subtriangular cross section, widest across the umbilical shoulders, with flanks fairing toward a narrow flattened venter.  Sutures on flanks are with smooth, deep lobes and with shallow ventral lobes.

The earlier, related Domatoceras is evolute, with a more quadrate whorl section.  Gryponautilus, from the Upper Triassic, is more strongly involute and has a sharply keeled venter.

References
 Bernhard Kummel, 1964, Nautiloidea-Nautilida. Treatise on Invertebrate Paleontology, Part K. Geological Society of America and University of Kansas Press.
Paleobiology Database Grypoceras entry  accessed 7 July 2012

Nautiloids